Andrew Bailey Tommy Sr. (December 24, 1911 – April 23, 1972) was a star professional Canadian football player for eleven seasons for the Ottawa Rough Riders and one season for the Toronto Argonauts. Tommy led his team to two Grey Cup wins, in 1940 and 1945. He was inducted into the Canadian Football Hall of Fame in 1989 and into the Canada's Sports Hall of Fame in 1976. 

He worked at the Dominion Bureau of Statistics.

References

External links
  
 Canada's Sports Hall of Fame profile

1911 births
1972 deaths
People from Carleton County, New Brunswick
Players of Canadian football from New Brunswick
Ottawa Rough Riders players
Toronto Argonauts players
Canadian Football Hall of Fame inductees